Dorka Gryllus (born 26 December 1972) is a Hungarian film and theatre actress. She is the daughter of Dániel Gryllus, a Hungarian musician, performer and composer, founding member of folk music group Kaláka and Katalin Kőváry, a theatre director and screenwriter. Gryllus grew up in Budapest and graduated from the College of Theater and Film Arts in 1998. Between 1998 and 2003 she was a member of the Gergely Csiky Theater in Kaposvár. Her breakthrough role came in the 2009 film Soul Kitchen. She has appeared in more than sixty films since 1995.

Selected filmography

References

External links

1972 births
Living people
Hungarian film actresses